The Brooks County School District is a public school district in Brooks County, Georgia, United States, based in Quitman. It serves the communities of Barwick, Grooverville, Morven, Pavo and Quitman.

Schools
The Brooks County School District has two elementary schools, one middle school, and one high school.

Elementary schools 
North Brooks Elementary School
Quitman Elementary School

Middle school
Brooks County Middle School

High school
Brooks County High School

References

External links

School districts in Georgia (U.S. state)
Education in Brooks County, Georgia